Gov. Simon Snyder Mansion is a historic home located at Selinsgrove in Snyder County, Pennsylvania. It is a -story stone house built in the early 19th century.  It features a gable roof and two gable end chimneys.  The building suffered a fire in 1874 after which a Victorian style porch and bay window were added.  It was the home of the third Governor of Pennsylvania Simon Snyder (1759–1819).

It was listed on the National Register of Historic Places in 1978.

See also 
 National Register of Historic Places listings in Snyder County, Pennsylvania

References 

Houses on the National Register of Historic Places in Pennsylvania
Houses completed in 1824
Houses in Snyder County, Pennsylvania
National Register of Historic Places in Snyder County, Pennsylvania
Governor of Pennsylvania